= DJ Sonica =

Bangladeshi DJ, singer and actress

- Born: Marzia Kabir Sonica
- Origin: Bangladesh
- Genres: EDM, House, Dance
- Occupations: DJ, Singer, Actress, TV Host
- Years active: 2007–present
- Label: Independent

Marzia Kabir Sonica, known as DJ Sonica is a Bangladeshi DJ, singer, TV host and actress.

== Career ==
Sonica started her DJ career in 2007.

Sonica performed at the ICC World CUP 2011 opening ceremony.

She received the award for "Best Bangladeshi Female DJ" in the Dhallywood Film and Music Awards in 2013.

DJ Sonica has also worked as a singer, releasing her first music video, "Bhallage", in 2014. The song has lyrics by Sonica and music by Shahan. They both lend their vocal in this song. In 2015 she worked as an actress in two television drama "Last Sequence" and "Thriple F". In 2021 she released a song with DJ Aks, called "Dance With You", and in 2022 she released "sheet sheet lage" with Maruf.
